Orthosia reticulata is a moth of the family Noctuidae. It is found in China and Taiwan.

Subspecies
Orthosia reticulata reticulata (China)
Orthosia reticulata fuscovestita Hreblay & Ronkay, 1998 (Taiwan)

References

Moths described in 1994
Orthosia